Aşağıköselerli is a village in Mut district of Mersin Province, Turkey. Situated at   it is close to the south bank of Göksu River. The population of the village was 956 as of 2012. 
The former name of the village was Kulfalı which is actually the name of the Turkmen tribe which founded the village in the 14th century. Kösreli and Köselerli are the corrupt forms of Kulfalı. They were the subjects of Karamanoğlu Beylik. But eventually the two wings of the village were issued from each other. After 1927. those who settled to the east of the river were called Aşağıköselerli ("lower Kösreli") and those who settled to the south and west of the river were called Yukarıköselerli ("upper Köselerli").  The most important crop of the village is paprika.

References

Villages in Mut District